Roberto "Bobby" Romulo (December 9, 1938 – January 23, 2022) was a Filipino businessman, diplomat and government official best known for being the Secretary of the Department of Foreign Affairs of the Philippines.

Early life and education
Roberto Romulo was born on December 9, 1938, in Manila to Carlos P. Romulo and Virginia Llamas.

He attended the Georgetown University of the United States where he finished his primary, secondary and college education before returning to the Philippines to study at the Ateneo de Manila University's College of Law to obtain his law degree.

Career

Diplomatic career
Romulo under the administration of President Corazon Aquino served as Ambassador to Belgium, Luxembourg, and the Commission of the European Communities. As a diplomat, he received various honors from Belgium, Thailand, Spain, Chile, France and the Philippines.

He was appointed Secretary of Foreign Affairs in 1992 by President Fidel V. Ramos. As head of the Department of Foreign Affairs, he oversaw the case of Flor Contemplacion, a Filipino migrant worker in Singapore, who was sentenced to death for murder which human rights groups argued were coerced to admit to committing crime. Contemplacion's execution led to a diplomatic crisis with the city-state and Romulo's resignation as secretary on April 30, 1995.

Death
Romulo died on January 23, 2022.

References

1938 births
2022 deaths
Ateneo de Manila University alumni
Filipino diplomats
Politicians from Manila